Gentiana paradoxa, the Caucasian gentian, is a species of flowering plant in the family Gentianaceae, endemic to the foothills of the Greater Caucasus Mountains in western Asia, near the Black Sea. It is one of several species of gentians that are valued in cultivation for the unusual bright blue colour of their blooms. However, it is not particularly easy to grow, requiring moist, well-drained, lime-free soil and a position in full sun. It is quite rare in nature.

This plant has gained the Royal Horticultural Society’s Award of Garden Merit.

Gallery

References

Flora of the Caucasus
paradoxa